Joseph Bitangcol (born March 28, 1984) is a Filipino television and film actor. He is one of the first batch of the reality talent search Star Circle Quest on ABS-CBN.

Career
Sef started when he joined the reality talent search of ABS-CBN which is Star Circle Quest in 2004. He made it to the Top 10 or "Magic Circle of 10", but unfortunately, he didn't make it to the final 5, or "Magic Circle of 5".

After the contest, he became part of ABS-CBN's Star Magic. He starred in the youth oriented program SCQ Reload with co-former questors and in horror-fantasy series Spirits which was directed by Chito Rono.  In 2006, he did his first movie with Star Cinema, entitled D' Lucky Ones, paired with Sandara Park.

Career on GMA Network
After his contract with ABS-CBN expired, he decided to leave his home grown network and sign another exclusive contract on its rival station GMA Network under GMA Artist Center. There he portrayed a role in drama series Babangon Ako't Dudurugin Kita. He also had a special participation in Yasmien Kurdi's TV drama titled Saan Darating Ang Umaga?, on the same network.
He is part of the new indie film with Polo Ravales titled Walang Kawala produces by D.M.B Entertainment Inc..

Back to ABS-CBN
In 2009, he returned to his home-grown network ABS-CBN and first appeared in May Bukas Pa following the fantasy series Agimat: Ang Mga Alamat ni Ramon Revilla: Tiagong Akyat co-star Gerald Anderson. He recently guested in Eat Bulaga!, a noontime show aired on GMA Network. He also voiced Prince Zardoz in the redubbed version of Voltes 5, known as Voltes 5: Evolution.

Personal life
Actor Joseph Bitangcol tied the knot with his non-showbiz girlfriend Franchesca Tonson at Sweet Harmony Gardens, Taytay, Rizal on July 30, 2016. The two have been in a relationship since December 13, 2014. Since then, Joseph and Franchesca have been open about their love for each other on their respective Instagram accounts. Franchesca is currently a nursing student in University of The Philippines.

Filmography

Television

Film

References

External links

1984 births
Living people
Star Magic
Filipino male child actors
Filipino male television actors
Star Circle Quest participants
Male actors from Pampanga